Archie John Bahm (21 August 1907 – 12 March 1996) was an American philosopher and professor of philosophy at the University of New Mexico.

Biography
Bahm served as Acting Chair of the University of New Mexico's Department of Philosophy from 1954 to 1955 and again from 1964 to 1965. He was a member of numerous committees to support and promote the exchange of philosophical ideas and organized the Albuquerque Chapter of the Southwestern Regional American Humanist Association in 1954. He was one of the signers of the Humanist Manifesto. He was also an organizer, past president, and past secretary-treasurer of the New Mexico Philosophical Society.

Bahm in 1933 contributed “A Religious Affirmation” to The New Humanist, listing items that “a person should”:

Be creedless; that is, be intelligent enough to make adaptations without dependence upon some formula. 
Be self-reliant; that is, be not dependent upon supernatural agency for intellectual support or moral guidance.
Be critical; that is, question assumptions and seek certitude scientifically. 
Be tolerant; that is, be open-minded and hold conclusions tentatively. 
Be active; that is, live today and grow by exercising his capacities. 
Be efficient; that is, accomplish the most with the least effort. 
Be versatile; that is, vary his interests to attain a variety of interesting thoughts. 
Be cooperative; that is, find some of his satisfactions in social activities. 
Be appreciative; that is, make the present enjoyable by his attitude. 
Be idealistic; that is, create and live by ideals which he finds inspiring.

Bibliography
Aforismos del Yoga (with Patanjali)
Axiology: The Science of Values
Comparative Philosophy: Western, Indian, and Chinese Philosophies Compared
Comparative Aesthetics
Computocracy - Government by Computer Users
Couleurs
Directory of American Philosophers, 1968-69
Directory of American Philosophers, 1970-71
Directory of American Philosophers, 1972-73
Directory of American Philosophers, 1973-81
Directory of American Philosophers, 1982-83
Directory of American Philosophers, 1984-91
Directory of American Philosophers, 1992-93
Directory of American Philosophers, 1994-2000
Directory of American Philosophers 2000-2001
Directory of American Philosophers, 2002-2003
Epistemology: Theory of Knowledge
Ethics: The Science of Oughtness
Ethics as a Behavioral Science
Executive Yoga
The Heart of Confucius, Interpretations of Genuine Living and Great Wisdom - with sixteen Ming Dynasty Confucian Prints
Metaphysics: An Introduction
Organicism: Origin and Development, Life and Publications of the Author
The Philosopher's World Model
Philosophy: An Introduction
Philosophy of the Buddha 
Polarity, Dialectic, and Organicity
The Specialist: His Philosophy, His Disease, His Cure
Tao Teh King by Lao Tzu
What Is Philosophy?
What Makes Acts Right?
Why Be Moral?
The World's Living Religions
Yoga for Business Executives and Professional People
Yoga Union with the Ultimate
Yoga Sutras of Patanjali

See also
American philosophy
List of American philosophers

References

External links
Inventory of the Archie J. Bahm Published Works, 1937–1993 at University of New Mexico Center for Southwest Research

20th-century American philosophers
Epistemology of religion
Philosophers of language
20th-century American educators
American humanists
University of New Mexico faculty
1907 births
1996 deaths
Place of birth missing
Place of death missing
Philosophers from New Mexico